Since 1974, the conservation graduate programs have held an annual meeting at one of the member programs in order to give current students the opportunity to present current research to their peers.

History
The first conference of North American graduate programs in the conservation of art and other cultural property was held in 1974 at the Corning Museum of Glass in response to a flood that damaged the museum's artifact and library collection on June 23, 1972. While only four percent (528 objects) of the museum's glass collection sustained damage, seventy-nine percent of the museum's library holdings were lost or severely devastated. This five-day conference entitled, "Conservation Seminar on Glass and Library Materials," was organized by Dr. Robert H. Brill, the Corning Museum's research scientist. For the first time, this conference brought together students, faculty, conservators, curators, and other museum specialists for several days of lectures and discussions on the field of conservation. Five American programs and a contingent from the Canadian Conservation Institute were in attendance; Cooperstown Graduate Program, Winterthur/University of Delaware, Intermuseum Conservation Association, New York University, Canadian Conservation Institute, and the Fogg Art Museum. Since the Corning Museum conference, annual meetings have become an integral part of ANAGPIC as a way to provide insight into the quality of the education provided by each program represented. Notable conservation professionals also present lectures during the conferences that address a specific area of interest in conservation, such as "Extreme Conservation" at the 2014 ANAGPIC conference. These lectures provide students with powerful insight on important issues for their future careers.

The Association of North American Graduate Programs in the Conservation of Cultural Property (ANAGPIC) was founded in May, 1984 by the following organizations: Buffalo State College, State University of New York, Art Conservation Department; Harvard University Art Museums, Straus Center for Conservation and Technical Studies; New York University, Conservation Center, Institute of Fine Arts; Queen's University, Art Conservation Program; Winterthur/University of Delaware Program in Art Conservation; The University of Texas at Austin, School of Information, Kilgarlin Center for Preservation of the Cultural Record.

Mission

The general purpose of the Association of North American Graduate Programs in the Conservation of Cultural Property (ANAGPIC) is to “help serve the need of the conservation field for well-trained professional conservators by aiding its member training programs to attain their educational objectives.”

In order for organizations to be eligible for membership, they must have provided conservation training for at least three consecutive years, and they must award a diploma, degree, or certificate formally acknowledged by their parent academic association. Within that parent institution, the member organization must be a distinct program, whose primary mission is conservation education and training. The program's curriculum must have substantial components of problem-solving in conservation and conservation science, and should conform to the AIC Code of Ethics and Guidelines for Practice. The student to faculty ratio must also be no greater than ten students per faculty member, and these faculty members must have professional qualifications to teach conservation at a graduate level. This can be demonstrated through substantial professional recognition through the International Institute for Conservation of Historic and Artistic Works (IIC), the American Institute for Conservation of Historic and Artistic Works (AIC), or the Canadian Association of Professional Conservators (CAPC).

At least one meeting of the ANAGPIC is held annually, normally concurrent with the annual Conference of the Conservation Training Programs, at present held in late spring. Typically, each institution is represented by two student presenters. Other meetings can be called as necessary if agreed to by at least two-thirds of the membership. Each member organization is normally represented by the training program director/chairperson. Due to a pandemic the 2020 ANAGPIC Conference, to be held in Buffalo, NY, was cancelled.

Current members

Buffalo State College, SUNY, Art Conservation Department
 Buffalo State College's Art Conservation Department was founded in 1970 as the Cooperstown Graduate Program in the Conservation of Historic and Artistic Works, affiliated with the State University of New York College at Oneonta and with the New York State Historical Association in Cooperstown. In 1983, the program transferred to Buffalo State College, and then relocated to its campus in 1987. Since its founding, Buffalo State offers a master of arts degree and certificate of advanced study in art conservation upon the completion of a three-year graduate program which trains conservators of fine art and material cultural heritage. This program accepts only 10 students per academic year. Buffalo State is the largest four-year college of arts and sciences in the State University of New York (SUNY) system.  Buffalo State's campus also hosts the Burchfield Penney Art Center and located across the street from the Albright-Knox Art Gallery.

Harvard University Art Museums, Straus Center for Conservation and Technical Studies

Overview

The Straus Center for Conservation and Technical Studies provides analysis and treatments for the Harvard Art Museums’ collection, consisting of more than 250,000 objects in all media, ranging in date from antiquity to the present. The Department of Technical Studies became the first institution worldwide to use scientific methods to study fine art when it was founded at the end of 1927 by Edward W. Forbes, director of Harvard University's Fogg Museum. In 1994, the center was renamed the Straus Center for Conservation and Technical Studies in honor of Philip A. and Lynn Straus, who were longtime benefactors of the Harvard Art Museums. The Straus Center includes the Forbes Pigment Collection and the Gettens Collection of Binding Media and varnishes. It  houses over 2,500 pigment samples.

New York University, Conservation Center, Institute of Fine Arts

The Conservation Center of the Institute of Fine Arts at New York University (NYU) was founded in 1960 with support from the Rockefeller Foundation. Since that time, the program has called for equal measures of art historical study, scientific training, and practical conservation experience. The goal was to produce a professional who would approach each object as an individual entity. The solution to an object's condition issues would be determined through research and study, unlike the tradesman restorer's approach, which applied standard treatments to objects and problems. Unlike other conservation graduate programs, NYU awards a four-year, dual-degree graduate program where students earn both their Masters in art history and in conservation. The Conservation Center is also the oldest degree-granting conservation program in North America.

Queen’s University, Art Conservation Program

 Since its founding in 1974, the Master of Art Conservation Program (MAC) at Queen's University in Kingston has offered the only full-time graduate-level training program in the field of art conservation in Canada. The MAC program's treatment stream is completed in two years and allows students to specialize in one of the following: treatment of artifacts, paintings, or paper. Each student chooses a specialization upon acceptance into the program. Students in the treatment streams have the opportunity to work with the humanities, science, and engineering departments at Queen's to undertake projects with museums, galleries, archives, the Canadian Conservation Institute, and industrial partners. Along with the treatment stream, the MAC program also offers a two-year research stream to science and engineering graduates, which would ultimately lead to a career in conservation science. Students in the research stream complete original research and a thesis surrounding topics such as the history of technology or other conservation-related areas.

University of California, Los Angeles/Getty

In 1999, Getty Conservation Institute and University of California, Los Angeles (UCLA) formally announced their intention to work together in creating a graduate-level program in archaeological and ethnographic conservation that could complement existing programs and expand educational opportunities. Students are provided with a solid educational base and a developed appreciation of the complex range of issues relating to significance, access, and use of these materials. The UCLA/Getty Master's Program on the Conservation of Archaeological and Ethnographic Materials is the only graduate conservation training program on the west coast of the United States, as well as the only program to focus primarily on archeological and ethnographic materials.  Unlike the other programs offered in North America, the UCLA/Getty program only admits students every two years, with an incoming class size between six and twelve students.

Winterthur/University of Delaware Program in Art Conservation

 The University of Delaware Art Conservation Department offers preservation degrees at the undergraduate, Master's, and PhD levels, including an undergraduate degree in Art Conservation offered at the Newark campus; a three-year Master's of Science in Art Conservation offered in collaboration between the University of Delaware and Winterthur Museum, Garden and Library; and doctoral program in Preservation Studies in collaboration with the Center for Material Culture Studies at the University of Delaware. In January 1969, the Winterthur Board of Trustees approved the creation of a coordinated program in museum conservation that would utilize Winterthur's conservation laboratories and the science and humanities departments at the University of Delaware. The Winterthur/University of Delaware Program in Art Conservation (WUDPAC) is a three-year Masters-level Program leading to a Master of Science in Art Conservation. Currently, the Crowninshield Research Building of the Winterthur Museum houses 26 conservation studios, laboratories, examination rooms, and workshops used by faculty and students in the graduate programs, as well as the Winterthur Scientific Research and Analysis Laboratory equipped with state-of-the-art analytical instrumentation.

Annual Meetings

The annual meetings held by the current member organizations of ANAGPIC have become an eagerly anticipated event among students, faculty, and speakers. They not only provide a venue for students to present current research to their peers, but to also build camaraderie among the students "that becomes the foundation of their future collegial relationships as practicing professionals."

See also
  Collections care
  Conservation-restoration
  Conservation science 
  Conservator-restorer
  Cultural conservation-restoration organizations	
  Object conservation
  Preventive conservation

References

Sources

 Buffalo State College. "ANAGPIC 2014 Buffalo | Art Conservation | Buffalo State." Art Conservation | Buffalo State. https://web.archive.org/web/20140413105908/http://artconservation.buffalostate.edu/students/anagpic-2014-buffalo (accessed April 14, 2014).
 Buffalo State College. "Art Conservation | Buffalo State." Art Conservation | Buffalo State. http://artconservation.buffalostate.edu (accessed April 14, 2014).
 COnservation OnLine. "ANAGPIC 2013 Student Papers & Posters." ANAGPIC 2013 Student Papers & Posters. http://cool.conservation-us.org/anagpic/studentpapers2013.htm (accessed April 14, 2014).
 Harvard University. "Straus Center for Conservation and Technical Studies." Harvard Art Museums. http://www.harvardartmuseums.org/study-research/straus  (accessed April 14, 2014).
 New York University, Institute of Fine Arts. "IFA - Conservation Center." IFA - Conservation Center. http://www.nyu.edu/gsas/dept/fineart/conservation/ (accessed April 14, 2014).
 North American Graduate Programs in the conservation of cultural property: histories, alumni. Buffalo, NY: ANAGPIC, 2000.
 Queen's University. "Art History and Art Conservation." Art Conservation. https://web.archive.org/web/20140415152849/http://www.queensu.ca/art/artconservation.html (accessed April 14, 2014).
 University of California, Los Angeles. "Cotsen Institute of Archaeology." Conservation Program. https://web.archive.org/web/20140410211125/http://ioa.ucla.edu/conservation-program/ (accessed April 14, 2014).
 University of Delaware. "Art Conservation at the University of Delaware : Masters." Art Conservation at the University of Delaware. http://www.artcons.udel.edu/masters (accessed April 14, 2014).
 Columbia University. "Columbia GSAPP MS in Historic Preservation." Architectural Conservation at Columbia University. https://www.arch.columbia.edu/programs/7-m-s-historic-preservation (accessed 23 June 2020).
 University of Pennsylvania. "Weitzman School of Design: MS in Historic Preservation." Architectural Conservation at the University of Pennsylvania. https://www.design.upenn.edu/historic-preservation/historic-preservation-about (accessed 23 June 2020).

External links
 The Association of North American Graduate Programs in the Conservation of Cultural Property

Heritage organizations
Organizations established in 1984
Conservation and restoration organizations